VFTS 352 is a contact binary star system  away in the Tarantula Nebula,  which is part of the Large Magellanic Cloud. It is the most massive and earliest spectral type overcontact system known.

The discovery of this O-type binary star system made use of the  European Southern Observatory's Very Large Telescope, and the description was published on 13 October 2015.  VFTS 352 is composed of two very hot (40,000 °C), bright and massive stars of equal size that orbit each other in little more than a day. The stars are so close that their atmospheres overlap. Both stars are rotating at a rate equal to their orbital period; that is, they are tidally locked. Extreme stars like the two components of VFTS 352 are thought to be the main producers of elements such as oxygen.

The future of VFTS 352 is uncertain, and there are two possible scenarios. If the two stars merge, a very rapidly rotating star will be produced. If it keeps spinning rapidly it might end its life in a long-duration gamma-ray burst. In a second hypothetical scenario, the components would end their lives in supernova explosions, forming a close binary black hole system, hence a potential gravitational wave source through black hole–black hole merger.

See also
Contact binary (small Solar System body), two asteroids gravitating toward each other until they touch

References

Stars in the Large Magellanic Cloud
Binary stars
O-type main-sequence stars
Tarantula Nebula
Extragalactic stars
J05382845-6911191
Dorado (constellation)
Emission-line stars